Harrellsville is a town in Hertford County, North Carolina, United States. The population was 106 at the 2010 census.

Geography
Harrellsville is located in southeastern Hertford County at  (36.303895, -76.790083). North Carolina Highway 45 runs through the town, leading northwest  to Winton, the county seat, and south  to Colerain.

Demographics

As of the census of 2000, there were 102 people, 47 households, and 36 families residing in the town. The population density was 307.3 people per square mile (119.3/km2). There were 50 housing units at an average density of 150.6 per square mile (58.5/km2). The racial makeup of the town was 71.49% White, 21.51% African American, 0.00% Native American, 0.00% Asian, 0.00% Pacific Islander, 0.00% from other races, and 0.00% from two or more races.  0.00% of the population are Hispanic or Latino of any race.

There were 47 households, out of which 29.8% had children under the age of 18 living with them, 59.6% were married couples living together, 12.8% had a female householder with no husband present, and 21.3% were non-families. 21.3% of all households were made up of individuals, and 14.9% had someone living alone who was 65 years of age or older. The average household size was 2.17 and the average family size was 2.49.

In the town, the population was spread out, with 19.6% under the age of 18, 28.4% from 25 to 44, 28.4% from 45 to 64, and 23.5% who were 65 years of age or older. The median age was 49 years. For every 100 females, there were 100.0 males. For every 100 females age 18 and over, there were 90.7 males.

The median income for a household in the town was $32,000, and the median income for a family was $31,500. Males had a median income of $30,833 versus $30,000 for females. The per capita income for the town was $17,051. None of the population and none of the families were below the poverty line.

History

The town of Harrellsville was founded in the 1820s by the Harrell families. A post office was established in 1827, and Abner Harrell became the postmaster in 1833. Originally known as Bethel, the town was changed to Harrellsville in the 1860s out of respect for Abner Harrell. Originally, Abner Harrell's house, one of the largest buildings in the town, remained standing until circa  2000, when the land it stood on was purchased and the house torn down.

The Harrellsville Historic District was listed on the National Register of Historic Places in 1995.

Notable person
 Robert Holmes Smith (1898–1943) Commander, Squadron 2, U.S. Navy Pacific Submarine Fleet in World War II

References

External links
 Harrellsville Information

Towns in Hertford County, North Carolina
Towns in North Carolina
Populated places established in 1827
1827 establishments in North Carolina